Velikent (Vəlikənd) is a rural locality (a selo) in Derbentsky District, Republic of Dagestan, Russia. The population was 4,202 as of 2010. The village has an Azerbaijani-majority. There are 47 streets.

Geography 
Velikent is located 24 km northwest of Derbent (the district's administrative centre) by road. Padar and Karadagly are the nearest rural localities.

References 

Rural localities in Derbentsky District